Kuźnica Kaszewska is a village in the administrative district of Gmina Kluki, within Bełchatów County, Łódź Voivodeship, in central Poland.

The village has a population of 100.

References

Villages in Bełchatów County